Salvatore Valitutti (1907–1992) was an educator and liberal politician who served as the minister of public education in the cabinet led by Prime Minister Francesco Cossiga in the period 1979–1980. He was one of the proponents of the Montessori education movement.

Early life and education
Valitutti was born in Bellosguardo, near Salerno, on 30 September 1907. His parents were Giuseppe and Amalia Macchiaroli, and he was the fifth of twelve siblings. 

Following the completion of secondary education in Salerno Valitutti attended the University of Political Sciences in Rome and graduated with a bachelor's degree in political sciences in 1930.

Career
Valitutti was an academic by profession and was the president of the University for Foreigners in Perugia. He was one of the supporters of the Montessori education movement and served as the vice president of the Opera Nazionale Montessori which was established by Maria Montessori to make her method of education widespread in Italy.

In 1963 Valitutti was elected as a deputy and began to serve at the Italian Parliament. He also served at the Italian Senate for the Italian Liberal Party for two terms: from Campania in 1972 and from Lazio in 1983. In 1972 he was appointed undersecretary of the Ministry of Education.

He was the vice president of the Liberal Party from 19 February to 4 July 1976. In 1971 Valitutti launched a magazine entitled Nuovi Studi Politici and published several articles in the magazine. He was named as the minister of public education in the cabinet of Francesco Cossiga and was in office between 5 August 1979 and 4 April 1980.

Death and legacy
Valitutti died in Rome on 1 October 1992. He was buried in the Bellosguardo cemetery next to his wife.

In memory of him a prize was established, Salvatore Valitutti International Prize.

References

External links

20th-century Italian educators
1907 births
1992 deaths
Deputies of Legislature IV of Italy
Education ministers of Italy
Heads of universities in Italy
Italian Liberal Party politicians
Italian magazine founders
Senators of Legislature IX of Italy
Montessori teachers
People from Salerno
Senators of Legislature VI of Italy